Chrysanthemum arisanense is a flowering pant within the Asteraceae family. It is also known as Dendranthema arisanense. Both species names and its two Chinese common names ( and ) refer to the Alishan Range C. arisanense is endemic to Taiwan and is found at elevations between 1,600 and 3,200 meters.

References 

 

Endemic flora of Taiwan
arisanense

vi:Dendranthema arisanense
zh:阿里山油菊